Eburia caymanensis is a species of beetle in the family Cerambycidae found on the Cayman Islands.

References

caymanensis
Beetles described in 1941